The 1929–30 Elitserien season was the third season of the Elitserien, the top level ice hockey league in Sweden. Six teams participated in the league, and IK Gota won the league championship for the third year in a row.

Final standings

External links
 1929-30 season

Elitserien (1927–1935) seasons
1929–30 in Swedish ice hockey
Sweden